This is a list of video games published by Sony Pictures Digital Entertainment This division is part of Sony Corporation's US mobile phone games division based in Culver City, CA.  Sony is one of the global leaders in mobile entertainment licensing and publishing specializing in branded interactive games and personalization products available for download by consumers via their mobile device through a wireless provider distribution network.

Mobile games 
Bewitched
Boondocks
Bounce & Slam
Casino Royale
Charlie's Angels
Cobra Kai Card Fighter
Da Vinci Code
Elevator Action
Ghostbusters
Jeopardy!
New York Times Word Challenge
Pop & Drop
Pink Panther
Puzzle Poker
Q*bert
Ratchet & Clank: Going Mobile
Ratchet & Clank: Clone Home (Never released)
Strategy Sports: Soccer
Snoop Dogg Boxing
Spider-Man 2
Stewart Little 2: Air Adventure
Swat 3D
Wheel of Fortune
xXx: The State of the Union,
You Got Served
Quadrapop

See also 
List of Sony Ericsson products#International phones

External links 
Games for Sony mobile phones

Sony Pictures mobile games
 
 
Sony Corporation
Sony Pictures